Dark culture (German Schwarze Szene; Portuguese cultura obscura; Spanish escena oscura; Italian scena Dark or scena gotica), also called dark alternative scene or Darkly-Inclined, includes goth and dark wave culture, most of the post-industrial scene (with the genres electro-industrial, EBM, aggrotech and dark electro) parts of neofolk and the early gothic metal associated scene. Dark culture's origin lies in followers of dark wave and independent music, but over the decades it has developed to a social network held together by a common concept of aesthetics, self-representation, and individualism.  The musical preferences of the dark scene are characterized by a mix of styles ranging from futurism, electropop, early music, (neo-) classical, and folk music to punk rock, rock, techno and ambient music.

Overview
Dark culture has historically been used as an umbrella term to describe several subcultures, only emerging as its own movement in the late 1980s. Dark culture includes goth and dark wave culture, electro subculture and parts of the neofolk and post-industrial subcultures. Sometimes referred to as 'dark alternative scene', the term is rarely used in the English language, despite its significance in shaping several other movements and subcultures that emerged throughout history. In this context, the "culture" should not be understood as closed subculture, but as a social environment, consisting of people with similar preferences. Dark culture is regarded as a community defined by common interests such as art, fashion, philosophy, and arguably most significantly, by music. Originating from the shared appreciation of dark wave and independent music, the term now collectively used as 'dark music', dark culture emerged to represent a group of people who define themselves through internal symbols and alternate forms of media. In the 21st century, the culture is appreciated as a heterogeneous collection of different subcultural currents, without being tied to a particular style of music, associated thinking, behavior, or dress code, despite most members sharing similar interests of such due to its emergence from the dark scene.

The scene is not a musically or aesthetically closed and homogeneous group but rather it is composed of many different currents, some of which may be diametrically opposed in their musical or fashion ideals.  The anchor that holds all elements of dark culture together can be viewed as the color black with all its associated symbolism. It is seen as an expression of seriousness, darkness and mysticism, but also of hopelessness and emptiness, melancholy, as well as its association with mourning and death. The dark scene is a community which defines itself through the characteristic fashions of the different currents, as well as through its media and meeting places, especially events and dance clubs.

History 
Although the significant movement of 'dark culture' only emerged in the late 1980s, a deeper history exists that inspired this movement dating back to the 1600s during the emergence of witchcraft and witches in Early Modern Europe, as well as the influence from Victorian iconographies. The origin of the term 'dark culture' initially appeared in Berlin, its use slowly emerging in more magazines and reports, finally becoming a widely-used term in the 1990s.

The term was used initially to target a specific group of magazine readers who shared similar interests in the dark scene, the magazine Zillo considered the most important media platform for dark culture and was at the forefront of anchoring the term 'dark culture' into modern language. Mostly used as a generic term for all sub-scenes and trends in the black scene, nowadays the term is preferred by a large number of scene followers. By 2010, it can be said that the term had properly established itself, particularly in sociology and youth culture research. Due to its emergence in Germany, an assessment was done to conduct the size of German dark culture in 2004, resulting in an estimation of around 50,000 to 100,000 members of people, this number later re-confirmed in 2010. This number has since grown and spreads internationally by the day, members of dark culture forming in many countries around the world.

Elements of dark culture 
The broad spectrum of dark culture has many elements that comprise the movement's general description. Music, the colour black, and fashion can be viewed as the main features of dark culture and are a few of the characteristics that allow for individual expression within the movement itself. The element of religion has been historically scrutinised as a signifier of dark culture, however many members of the scene attribute occultist ways of thinking to religious beliefs.

Music 

Dark culture is divided into different currents, some of which are in stark contrast to one another in their musical and fashion ideas. The musical preferences of the different supporters of the black scene are characterized by a style mix that covers a broad spectrum from avant-garde to electronic pop music, early music, neo-classical and folk to punk rock, techno and ambient. The term dark music is preferred in the social and cultural studies of music within dark culture, used as a collective term for the entirety of the music received in this scene. Alternate dark waves of music includes darkcore, dark ambient, dark cabaret, dark folk, dark psytrance, and dark wave music which is part of the new wave movement.

Due to its internationally recognized events and the high proportion of music produced in Germany, the German subculture is perceived as outstanding and special. Much of dark culture's foundations can be attributed to beginning in Germany, where the movement is celebrated by many, particularly visible in the element of music. Throughout Germany, dark music is very popular and each year the country hosts a number of festivals that celebrate this musical genre. 'Wave-Gotik-Treffen' is an annual festival held in Leipzig, Germany, which honours 'dark music' and 'dark culture', attracting between 18,000 - 20,000 attendees each year. The event is one of the largest worldwide celebrations of the gothic, cybergoth, steampunk, and rivethead subcultures, hosting up to 200 alternate bands each year.

The colour black 
The colour black within dark culture can be noted as the lowest common denominator in recognizing features of this movement. Black is a central part of communication within dark culture, symbolizing and representing a vast spectrum of elements this scene represents, within emotion, fashion, music, and general behavior. Among other things, it is a visual expression of feelings surrounding hopelessness, melancholy, darkness, and is moreover most significantly used as a reference towards grief and death.

Fashion 
In addition to the color black, aesthetic awareness and a theme of individuality has been at the center of dark culture. These factors require a constant individual self-presentation against the background of what can be considered as 'the norm'. Thus, the main points of social demarcation are stylistic and visually aesthetic, whereby the fashion and style becomes the core content of self-expression.

Since its emergence, dark culture has differentiated a range of sub-scenes, resulting in a variation of emerging styles, all independent however in close similarity to a general 'gothic style'. The different currents of dark culture often intrinsically influenced one another throughout the gradual development of the movement. While there were always dominant style elements in the different time periods in which dark culture has existed, these were often combined with other current or past styles, however all generally corresponding to a typical 'gothic style' which has existed for many years and can be dated back to styles existing during the Victorian era. Despite the deep rooting in the history of dark culture's fashion, the evolution of stylistic elements and their fluid nature means that the scene cannot be reduced to a certain appearance. A general similarity can only be determined in the dominance of the color black, the general appearance of dark culture usually corresponding to a mixed form of different stylistic elements. 

The colour black and the rise of consciousness surrounding aesthetics and visual self expression have been developed through the stylistic elements that dark culture represents. Although the fashion of the movement cannot be narrowed down to one particular style, there are notable common aesthetic choices made by members of the scene. Body jewelry such as piercings and tattoos are just as common as clothing in the realm of self-expression in dark culture. Jewelry is mostly worn in silver and steel and often include animal symbols in the form of spiders, snakes and scorpions as well as religious and mythological symbols. Furthermore, alternate materials that are generally seen as more 'alternate' fashion choices are enjoyed by dark culture designers such as leather, mesh and velvet. Articles of clothing that are also seen as more androgynous are common within the scene, such as men's skirts and more masculine fits of clothing worn by females to challenge societal gender norms.

Religion 
Religion as an element of dark culture has been viewed by many in the scene as an abstract topic that is constantly critically questioned. The concept of death which stands as a main theme within dark culture, as well as the human emotion in dealing with mourning is considered by some members of the movement to be relative to religious content. Throughout recent years, the attention to the topic of faith has been attributed to humanity's continuation in attaining the meaning behind the concept of being, which has been seen as especially prevalent within youth. This engagement with finding a higher power of meaning in life, specifically within religion, although not directly relative, has been considered by some to be a leading element of what dark culture represents. In the scene, religious rituals and ceremonies have been explored yet are not engrained in the foundations of what dark culture was bred from. Despite this, the theoretical and practical preoccupation with occultism and esotericism has always been a permanent part of dark culture, and in some ways can be attributed to religious movements and ways of thinking.

Gothic subculture 
Although the term dark culture has been used in scene media and the press since the 90s, the misleading title Gothic, referring to a sub-flow of the scene, is wrongly used to describe elements specifically linked to dark culture. Since circa 2004, term 'Gothic' has been used by non-members of the dark scene to wrongly title members of dark culture, leading to much confusion and controversy regarding all sub-cultures and sub-flows of dark culture. The Gothic subculture is specifically linked to the post-punk and wave movement within music, and thus only represents a small portion of the large spectrum of dark culture, despite Gothicism being used as an overarching term to name all members of the dark scene. Due to this, the use of gothic subculture as a term has sparked controversy within dark culture, most notable in the music press industry and international use of the term, such misuse rooted in confusion and lack of knowledge of the subcultures and their differentiating elements.

Events 

Throughout history, highly significant events have evolved in the celebration and acknowledgement of movements surrounding dark culture. Today, the most significant of these is World Goth Day, which originated in the United Kingdom in 2009, since then, its observance spreading internationally. This event is held on 22 May, and is described as "a day where the goth scene gets to celebrate its own being, and an opportunity to make its presence known to the rest of the world." Aspects of dark culture's fashion, music, and art are celebrated on this day and combine to honour the history of this movement and the inclusivity and dark expression that it represents.

Events that celebrate the movement include festivals, such as Blackfield, Castle Rock, and Dark Dance which all focus exclusively on interpretations of dark culture. Other events that are not specifically attributed to the celebration of dark culture, however, feature dark music artists and bands include Amphi festival, Dark Malta festival, Secret Garden festival, and Zita rock festival.

References 

Musical subcultures
Goth subculture